Black Hammock is an unincorporated community and census-designated place in Seminole County, Florida, United States. Its population was 1,144 as of the 2010 census.

Geography

References

Unincorporated communities in Seminole County, Florida
Unincorporated communities in Florida
Census-designated places in Seminole County, Florida
Census-designated places in Florida